Feature Magnetic is the fourteenth solo studio album by American recording artist Kool Keith. It was released on September 16, 2016 via Mello Music Group and produced entirely by Keith under his alias Number One Producer, except for three tracks produced by Futurewave, Giz, Ocean Ave Records, and Ol Man 80zz. The project featured guest appearances from B.a.R.S. Murre, Craig G, Dirt Nasty, Ed O.G., Freddie Foxxx, Godfather Don, Mac Mall, MF Doom, Necro, Psycho Les, Ras Kass, Sadat X, and Slug.

Track listing

Personnel 

 Keith Matthew Thornton – vocals, executive producer, producer (tracks: 1-7, 10-11, 13-14)
 Michael Tolle – executive producer
 Steve Rossiter – mastering
 Christopher Parker – photography
 Sarah Dalton – design
 Craig Curry – vocals (track 3)
 Daniel Dumile – vocals (tracks: 4, 15)
 Derek Murphy – vocals (track 12)
 Edward Anderson – vocals (track 9)
 Jamal Rocker – vocals (track 8)
 James Campbell – vocals (track 10)
 John Austin IV – vocals (track 13)
 Lester Fernandez – vocals (track 6)
 Rodney Chapman – vocals (track 2)
 Ron Raphael Braunstein – vocals (track 7)
 Sean Michael Daley – vocals (track 11)
 Simon Rex Cutright – vocals (track 5)
 Marc Santo – photography
 Laci Taylor – model
 Jeremiah Thornton – model

References

External links 
Feature Magnetic at Bandcamp

Feature Magnetic at iTunes

2016 albums
Kool Keith albums